Shurestan-e Sofla may refer to:

Shurestan-e Sofla, Qazvin
Shurestan-e Sofla, Razavi Khorasan